

Tudor Vladimirescu National College is a high school located at 13 Unirii Street, Târgu Jiu, Romania.

For some time, the residents of Târgu Jiu had requested a permanent school. Their cause was taken up by the local notable Toma Cămărășescu, who in 1890 helped persuade Education Minister Titu Maiorescu to sign an order establishing a gymnasium. The school opened later that year, and was named after revolutionary Tudor Vladimirescu in 1897. In 1919, the institution became a high school, with the first class graduating in 1923.

Girls were first admitted in 1961, when a nearby girls’ high school was merged into Vladimirescu. In 1972–1973, the school building began to host an institute for junior engineers. From 1977 until the Romanian Revolution, the institution focused mainly on mathematics and physics. It was declared a national college in 1999.

The school building was started in 1891 and completed three years later. Soon afterwards, a pottery school and county museum were opened inside. It is listed as a historic monument by Romania's Ministry of Culture and Religious Affairs.

Faculty and alumni

Faculty
Ștefan Bobancu
Iuliu Moisil

Alumni
Mircea Beuran
Emil Ciocoiu
Petru Dumitriu
Iosif Keber
Mihail Lascăr
Horațiu Mălăele

Notes

External links

 Official site

Historic monuments in Gorj County
Education in Târgu Jiu
Schools in Gorj County
Educational institutions established in 1890
1890 establishments in Romania
National Colleges in Romania
School buildings completed in 1894